OfficeArrow is a business-to-business social media platform that is localized to the United States, providing a deal-of-the-day product, discount purchasing club, professionally sourced educational content, community discussion forums, and social functionality targeted towards entrepreneurs, small business executives, and other professionals.

Deal-of-the-day
The OfficeArrow deal-of-the-day product offers only business products such as software and office supplies at a discount of between 50% and 90%. They offer one coupon per day. Advertisers are charged 50% of the total sale price.

While this model is almost identical to that of Groupon, OfficeArrow differs in that it does not restrict deals with minimum participation. In this regard, it is  similar to American Internet retailer Woot. Some national brands and Internet retailers find this sales promotion tool useful for generating qualified sales leads.

Community
Unlike Woot, Groupon, and other daily deal products, OfficeArrow's business is not built on the daily coupon. OfficeArrow.com connects paying and free members socially and professionally, offering a variety of social media capabilities, such as profiles, discussions, private messaging, and a virtual book club. OfficeArrow  maintains databases of both expert- and community generated content, such as webinars, instructional articles, and document templates. Their professional discount club offers users regular discounts on goods and services from companies like American Express, Constant Contact, and Dymo.

References

External links
OfficeArrow website

Social media companies
Professional networks
Marketing companies of the United States
Internet properties established in 2008
Deal of the day services